Patrick John Micheletti (born December 11, 1963) is an American former ice hockey center who played 12 games in the National Hockey League with the Minnesota North Stars during the 1987–88 season. The rest of his career, which lasted from 1986 to 1992, was mainly spent in the Italian Serie A. The North Stars selected Micheletti with the 185th overall pick in the 1982 NHL Entry Draft. He also played for the Minnesota Golden Gophers men's ice hockey team. One of nine children, Pat Micheletti's brother Joe Micheletti also played in the NHL.

Career statistics

Regular season and playoffs

Awards and honors

References

External links

Micheletti's profile @ Hockeydraftcentral.com

1963 births
Living people
AHCA Division I men's ice hockey All-Americans
American men's ice hockey centers
Asiago Hockey 1935 players
College hockey announcers in the United States
HC Varese players
Ice hockey players from Minnesota
Kalamazoo Wings (1974–2000) players
Minnesota Golden Gophers men's ice hockey players
Minnesota North Stars draft picks
Minnesota North Stars players
Sportspeople from Hibbing, Minnesota
Springfield Indians players